The 1997–98 Czech Extraliga season was the fifth season of the Czech Extraliga since its creation after the breakup of Czechoslovakia and the Czechoslovak First Ice Hockey League in 1993.

Standings

Playoffs

Quarterfinal
 HC Petra Vsetín - HC IPB Pojišťovna Pardubice 7:0 (2:0,3:0,2:0)
 HC Petra Vsetín - HC IPB Pojišťovna Pardubice 5:2 (2:1,2:1,1:0)
 HC IPB Pojišťovna Pardubice - HC Petra Vsetín 3:4 (0:2,2:1,1:1)
 HC Sparta Praha - HC Keramika Plzeň 2:3 SN (1:0,0:1,1:1,0:0)
 HC Sparta Praha - HC Keramika Plzeň 4:2 (2:2,1:0,1:0)
 HC Keramika Plzeň - HC Sparta Praha 5:2 (1:2,1:0,3:0)
 HC Keramika Plzeň - HC Sparta Praha 1:2 (0:0,1:0,0:2)
 HC Sparta Praha - HC Keramika Plzeň 4:1 (2:0,1:1,1:0)
 HC Vítkovice - HC Chemopetrol Litvínov 5:2 (0:1,2:1,3:0)
 HC Vítkovice - HC Chemopetrol Litvínov 6:5 (1:1,2:3,3:1)
 HC Chemopetrol Litvínov - HC Vítkovice 2:0 (0:0,1:0,1:0)
 HC Chemopetrol Litvínov - HC Vítkovice 3:4 (1:2,2:2,0:0)
 HC Železárny Třinec - HC Slavia Praha 4:3 (2:1,1:0,1:2)
 HC Železárny Třinec - HC Slavia Praha 3:4 (1:1,1:3,1:0)
 HC Slavia Praha - HC Železárny Třinec 4:5 SN (2:3,2:1,0:0,0:0)
 HC Slavia Praha - HC Železárny Třinec 7:4 (3:2,1:1,3:1)
 HC Železárny Třinec - HC Slavia Praha 7:0 (1:0,3:0,3:0)

Semifinal
 HC Petra Vsetín - HC Sparta Praha 4:1 (2:0,2:1,0:0)
 HC Petra Vsetín - HC Sparta Praha 3:1 (0:0,2:1,1:0)
 HC Sparta Praha - HC Petra Vsetín 4:1 (2:0,0:1,2:0)
 HC Sparta Praha - HC Petra Vsetín 2:5 (0:2,1:2,1:1)
 HC Vítkovice - HC Železárny Třinec 6:5 (3:3,2:1,1:1)
 HC Vítkovice - HC Železárny Třinec 0:4 (0:3,0:1,0:0)
 HC Železárny Třinec - HC Vítkovice 3:1 (0:0,2:0,1:1)
 HC Železárny Třinec - HC Vítkovice 1:4 (1:2,0:2,0:0)
 HC Vítkovice - HC Železárny Třinec 1:4 (0:0,1:2,0:2)

3rd place
 HC Sparta Praha - HC Vítkovice 4:9 (2:0,0:6,2:3)
 HC Vítkovice - HC Sparta Praha 1:2 (1:1,0:1,0:0)

Final
HC Vsetin - HC Zelezarny Trinec 5-1, 4-1, 3-1

HC Vsetin is Czech champion for 1997-98.

Relegation
 HC Bohemex Trade Opava - HC Znojemští Orli 1:4 (1:1,0:2,0:1)
 HC Bohemex Trade Opava - HC Znojemští Orli 1:2 (0:0,1:2,0:0)
 HC Znojemští Orli - HC Bohemex Trade Opava 3:2 (1:0,2:2,0:0)
 HC Znojemští Orli - HC Bohemex Trade Opava 1:4 (0:2,1:1,0:1)
 HC Bohemex Trade Opava - HC Znojemští Orli 6:4 (2:1,2:1,2:2)
 HC Znojemští Orli - HC Bohemex Trade Opava 2:3 PP (0:2,0:0,2:0,0:1)
 HC Bohemex Trade Opava - HC Znojemští Orli 6:0 (3:0,2:0,1:0)

External links  
 

Czech Extraliga seasons
1997–98 in Czech ice hockey
Czech